Sweden Rocks is a 2006 live album by the American hard rock guitarist Ted Nugent, recorded at the Sweden Rock Festival in 2006. It was also released at the same time as a live DVD.  Bassist Barry Sparks would depart Nugent's band shortly after, at which time Greg Smith took over.

This performance was a rare occasion where Nugent used his white Gibson Byrdland, affectionately named the Great White Buffalo, for songs other than GWB.

Track listing
All songs written by Ted Nugent, except where noted.

 "Stormtroopin'" – 3:39
 "Wango Tango" – 5:50
 "Snakeskin Cowboys" – 6:14
 "Free-for-All" – 3:55
 "Wang Dang Sweet Poontang" – 8:15
 "Rawdogs & Warhogs" – 3:53
 "Soul Man" (Isaac Hayes, David Porter) – 1:22
 "Hey Baby" (Derek St. Holmes) – 4:29
 "Dog Eat Dog" – 4:30
 "Still Raising Hell" – 3:20
 "Cat Scratch Fever" – 4:37
 "Stranglehold" – 9:55
 "Great White Buffalo" – 8:26

DVD track listing
"Stormtroopin'" 
"Wango Tango"
"Snakeskin Cowboys" 
"Free for All"  
"Wang Dang Sweet Poontang" 
"Klstrphnky" 
"Raw Dogs & War Hogs" 
"Soul Man"  
"Hey Baby"  
"Dog Eat Dog" 
"Still Raising Hell"  
"Motor City Madhouse" 
"Cat Scratch Fever"  
"Stranglehold"
"Great White Buffalo"

Bonus Material 
Live 2007
"Journey to the Center of the Mind"
"Weekend Warriors"
"Love Grenade"

Interview with Barry Sparks and Tommy Clufetos
Bow Hunting with Ted
Ted on the Gun Range

Personnel
Ted Nugent – guitars, vocals
Barry Sparks – bass, backing vocals, lead vocals on "Hey Baby"
Mick Brown – drums, backing vocals

References

2008 live albums
Ted Nugent albums
2008 video albums
Live video albums
Eagle Records live albums
Eagle Records video albums